Communist Party of Nepal (United) was a political party in Nepal. It was founded in 2007, following a split in the Communist Party of Nepal (United Marxist).

Chandra Dev Joshi chairman of the party and  Sunil Manandhar general secretary of the party. In 2008 Nepal's first openly homosexual representative, Sunil Babu Pant was elected to the Constituent Assembly from the party list.

The party merged into CPN (Maoist Centre) on 11 October 2017 ahead of the 2017 elections.

History 
The party was founded following a split in the Communist Party of Nepal (United Marxist) when Ganesh Shah and Chandra Dev Joshi broke away from the party. In the 2008 Constituent Assembly elections, the party won five seats from proportional voting. The party selected Sunil Babu Pant, the first openly homosexual lawmaker in Asia from the party list. Party chairman Chandra Dev Joshi was also appointed as the Minister for Land Reform and Management in the Baburam Bhattari cabinet in 2011.

In the 2013 Constituent Assembly elections the party won three seats from proportional voting. The party merged into CPN (Maoist Centre) on 11 October 2017.

Electoral performance

See also
 List of communist parties in Nepal
 Communist Party of Nepal (Unified)

References

2007 establishments in Nepal
2017 disestablishments in Nepal
Defunct communist parties in Nepal
Political parties disestablished in 2017
Political parties established in 2007